John Brent may refer to:
 John Brent (antiquary) (1808–1882), English novelist, poet and antiquary
 John Brent (comedian) (1938–1985), American actor, comedian and beat poet
 Brent (Planet of the Apes), a character from The Planet of the Apes

See also
 Johnny Brent Cueto (born 1986), Dominican baseball player